The Sullivan principles are the names of two corporate codes of conduct, developed by the African-American preacher Rev. Leon Sullivan, promoting corporate social responsibility:
 The original Sullivan principles were developed in 1977 to apply economic pressure on South Africa in protest of its system of apartheid. The principles eventually gained wide adoption among United States–based corporations.
For more, see #The Sullivan principles below.
 The new global Sullivan principles were jointly unveiled in 1999 by Rev. Sullivan and United Nations Secretary General Kofi Annan. The new and expanded corporate code of conduct, as opposed to the originals' specific focus on South African apartheid, were designed to increase the active participation of corporations in the advancement of human rights and social justice at the international level.

The Sullivan principles

In 1977, Rev. Leon Sullivan, an African-American minister, was a member of the board of General Motors. At the time, General Motors was one of the largest corporations in the United States. General Motors also happened to be the largest employer of black people in South Africa, a country which was pursuing a harsh program of state-sanctioned racial segregation and discrimination targeted primarily at the country's black population.

Sullivan, looking back on his anti-Apartheid efforts, recalled:

Starting with the work place, I tightened the screws step by step and raised the bar step by step. Eventually I got to the point where I said that companies must practice corporate civil disobedience against the laws and I threatened South Africa and said in two years Mandela must be freed, apartheid must end, and blacks must vote or else I'll bring every American company I can out of South Africa.

The original principles
The Sullivan principles, introduced in 1977 with one addition in 1984, consisted of seven requirements a corporation was to demand for its employees as a condition for doing business.  In general, the principles demanded the equal treatment of employees regardless of their race both within and outside of the workplace, demands which directly conflicted with the official South African policies of racial segregation and unequal rights.

The principles read:

Mixed success
The Sullivan principles were celebrated when introduced and gained wide use in the United States, particularly during the disinvestment campaign of the 1980s. Before the end of South Africa's apartheid era, the principles were formally adopted by more than 125 US corporations that had operations in South Africa. Of those companies that formally adopted the principles, at least 100 completely withdrew their existing operations from South Africa.

However, as South Africa's system of apartheid persisted relatively unchanged from the 1970s into the late 1980s, Sullivan "abandoned [his principles] as not going far enough" complaining that the principles by themselves were not enough to pressure a South African government steadfast in its refusal to yield to change.

The global Sullivan principles
In 1999, more than 20 years after the adoption of the original Sullivan Principles and six years after the end of apartheid, the Rev. Leon Sullivan and United Nations Secretary General Kofi Annan together unveiled the new "Global Sullivan Principles".

The overarching objective of these principles, according to Leon Sullivan, is "to support economic, social and political justice by companies where they do business," including respect for human rights and equal work opportunities for all peoples.

The new principles
In general, the expanded corporate code of conduct requires adopting multinational companies to be a full participant in the advancement of human rights and social justice internationally.

The new principles read:

See also
 Disinvestment from South Africa
 Corporate social responsibility
 Leon Sullivan
 Socially responsible investing
 Corporate behaviour

References

Racial segregation
Boycotts of apartheid South Africa
Human rights instruments
South Africa–United States relations
International sanctions
Corporate social responsibility
Codes of conduct